Danube–Tisza Interfluve is the landscape in Hungarian territory (Hungary and Vojvodina (Vajdaság) in Serbia) in the Pannonian Basin between the Danube and Tisza rivers, east of Transdanubia. It covers a large part of the Great Hungarian Plain.

Geography
Its borders are Danube (west), Tisza (east), and Fruška Gora (Tarcal Mountain) (south). Its northeastern border is Rétköz small-landscape in Szabolcs-Szatmár-Bereg county.

The largest green area is the Kiskunság National Park. Avocets, geese and black-winged stilts nest in the area. The lakes provide a temporary home for tens of thousands of migratory birds. This ornithologist paradise is also a UNESCO biosphere reserve. Lake Szelid near Kalocsa, Lake Vadkert by Soltvadkert, Lake Kunfehér and Lake Sós at Kiskunhalas are ideal spots for bathing and camping.

Cities in Hungary 
Budapest (17 districts out of 23)
Kecskemét
Szeged
Szolnok
Eger
Miskolc

Cities in Serbia 
Novi Sad (Újvidék)
Subotica (Szabadka)
Sombor (Zombor)

See also 
 Kiskunság National Park

References 
Regional habitat pattern of the Danube-Tisza Interfluve
Kiskunság National Park

Geography of Hungary